Pityakovo is a rural locality (a selo) and the administrative centre of Staropetrovsky Selsoviet, Birsky District, Bashkortostan, Russia. The population was 615 as of 2010. There are 11 streets.

Geography 
Pityakovo is located 22 km south of Birsk (the district's administrative centre) by road. Staropetrovo is the nearest rural locality.

References 

Rural localities in Birsky District